Lock Seventeen is an unincorporated community in Tuscarawas County, in the U.S. state of Ohio.

History
Lock Seventeen had its start when a lock was built on the nearby canal in 1829. The lock was known as Lock Seventeen, hence the name.  A post office called Lock Seventeen was established in 1862, and remained in operation until 1895.

References

Unincorporated communities in Tuscarawas County, Ohio
Unincorporated communities in Ohio